The snowshoe hare (Lepus americanus), also called the varying hare or snowshoe rabbit, is a species of hare found in North America. It has the name "snowshoe" because of the large size of its hind feet. The animal's feet prevent it from sinking into the snow when it hops and walks. Its feet also have fur on the soles to protect it from freezing temperatures.

For camouflage, its fur turns white during the winter and rusty brown during the summer. Its flanks are white year-round. The snowshoe hare is also distinguishable by the black tufts of fur on the edge of its ears. Its ears are shorter than those of most other hares.

In summer, it feeds on plants such as grass, ferns, and leaves; in winter, it eats twigs, the bark from trees, and plants and, similar to the Arctic hare, has been known to occasionally eat dead animals. It can sometimes be seen feeding in small groups. This animal is mainly active at night and does not hibernate. The snowshoe hare may have up to four litters in a year, which average three to eight young. Males compete for females, and females may breed with several males.

A major predator of the snowshoe hare is the Canada lynx. Historical records of animals caught by fur hunters over hundreds of years show the lynx and hare numbers rising and falling in a cycle, which has made the hare known to biology students worldwide as a case study of the relationship between numbers of predators and their prey.

Taxonomy and distribution 
Snowshoe hares occur from Newfoundland to Alaska; south in the Sierra Nevada to central California; in the Rocky Mountains to southern Utah and northern New Mexico; and in the Appalachian Mountains to West Virginia. Populations in its southern range, such as in Ohio, Maryland, North Carolina, New Jersey, Tennessee, and Virginia have been extirpated. Locations of subspecies are as follows:

Lepus americanus americanus (Erxleben) – Ontario, Manitoba, Saskatchewan, Alberta, Montana, and North Dakota
L. a. cascadensis (Nelson) – British Columbia and Washington
L. a. columbiensis (Rhoads) – British Columbia, Alberta, and Washington
L. a. dalli (Merriam) – Mackenzie District, British Columbia, Alaska, Yukon
L. a. klamathensis (Merriam) – Oregon and California
L. a. oregonus (Orr) – Oregon
L. a. pallidus (Cowan) – British Columbia
L. a. phaeonotus (J. A. Allen) – Ontario, Manitoba, Saskatchewan, Michigan, Wisconsin, and Minnesota
L. a. pineus (Dalquest) – British Columbia, Idaho, and Washington
L. a. seclusus (Baker and Hankins) – Wyoming
L. a. struthopus (Bangs) – Newfoundland, Nova Scotia, New Brunswick, Prince Edward Island, Quebec, and Maine
L. a. tahoensis (Orr) – California, western Nevada
L. a. virginianus (Harlan) – Ontario, Quebec, Maine, New Hampshire, Vermont, Massachusetts, New York, Pennsylvania
L. a. washingtonii (Baird) – British Columbia, Washington, and Oregon

Description
The snowshoe hare's fur is rusty brown in the spring and summer, and white in the winter. It also always has a gray underbelly, and black on the tips and edges of its ears and tail. It has very large hind feet, and dense fur on their soles. The snowshoe hare's ears are not as long as some other species of hares' ears. In the winter, it turns a bright white to blend in with the snow.

Snowshoe hares range in length from 413 to 518 mm (16.3 to 20.4 in), of which 39 to 52 mm (1.5 to 2.0 in) are tail. The hind foot, long and broad, measures 117 to 147 mm (4.6  to 5.8 in) in length. The ears are 62 to 70 mm (2.4 to 2.8 in) from notch to tip. Snowshoe hares usually weigh between 1.43 and 1.55 kg (3.15 to 3.42 lb). Males are slightly smaller than females, as is typical for leporids. In the summer, the coat is a grizzled rusty or grayish brown, with a blackish middorsal line, buffy flanks and a white belly. The face and legs are cinnamon brown. The ears are brownish with black tips and white or creamy borders. During the winter, the fur is almost entirely white, except for black eyelids and the blackened tips on the ears. The soles of the feet are densely furred, with stiff hairs (forming the snowshoe) on the hind feet.

Habitats 

Snowshoe hares are primarily found in boreal forests and upper montane forests; within these forests, they favor habitats with a dense shrub layer.

In the Pacific Northwest, snowshoe hares occupy diverse habitats, including mature conifers (mostly Douglas-fir [Pseudotsuga menziesii] and variants), immature conifers, alder (Alnus spp.)/salmonberry (Rubus spectabilis), Sitka spruce (Picea sitchensis)/salal (Gaultheria shallon), and cedar (Thuja spp.) swamps. In western Oregon, snowshoe hares were present in brush patches of vine maple (Acer circinatum), willows (Salix spp.), rhododendrons (Rhododendron spp.), and other shrubs.

In Utah, snowshoe hares used Gambel oak (Quercus gambelli) in the northern portion of the Gambel oak range. In the Southwest, the southernmost populations of snowshoe hares occur in
the Sangre de Cristo Mountains, New Mexico, in subalpine scrub: narrow bands of shrubby and prostrate conifers at and just below timberline that are usually composed of Engelmann spruce (Picea engelmannii), bristlecone pine (Pinus aristata), limber pine (P. flexilis), and/or common juniper (Juniperus communis).

In Minnesota, snowshoe hares use jack pine (P. banksiana) uplands, edges, tamarack (Larix laricina) bogs, black spruce (Picea mariana) bogs, and sedge (Carex spp.), alder, and scrub fens. In New England, snowshoe hares favor second-growth aspen (Populus spp.)-birch (Betula spp.) near conifers, but other forest types occupied by snowshoe hares include aspens, paper birch (B. papyrifera), northern hardwoods, red maple (A. rubrum), balsam fir (Abies balsamea), red
spruce (Picea rubens)-balsam fir, eastern hemlock (Tsuga canadensis), northern red oak (Quercus rubra), oak (Quercus spp.)-pine (Pinus spp.), eastern white pine (P. strobus)-northern red oak-red maple, and eastern white pine. Snowshoe hares also use shrub swamps dominated by buttonbush (Cephalanthus occidentalis), alders, and silky dogwood (Cornus ammomum). Further details on plant communities used by snowshoe hares in different regions are in Bittner and Rongstad.

Reproduction and Leverets 

Like all leporids, snowshoe hares are crepuscular and nocturnal. They are shy and secretive and spend most of the day in shallow depressions, called forms, scraped out under clumps of ferns, brush thickets, and downed piles of timber. They occasionally use the large burrows of mountain beavers (Aplodontia rufa) as forms. Diurnal activity level increases during the breeding season. Juveniles are usually more active and less cautious than adults.

Snowshoe hares are active year-round. The breeding season for hares is stimulated by new vegetation and varies with latitude, location, and yearly events (such as weather conditions and phase of snowshoe hare population cycle). Breeding generally begins in late December to January and lasts until July or August . In northwestern Oregon, male peak breeding activity (as determined by testes weight) occurs in May and is at the minimum in November. In Ontario, the peak is in May and in Newfoundland, the peak is in June. Female estrus begins in March in Newfoundland, Alberta, and Maine, and in early April in Michigan and Colorado. First litters of the year are born from mid-April to May.

The gestation period is 35 to 40 days; most studies report 37 days as the average length of gestation. Litters average three to five leverets depending on latitude, elevation, and phase of population cycle, ranging from one to seven. Deep snow-pack increases the amount of upper-branch browse available to snowshoe hares in winter, and therefore has a positive relationship with the nutritional status of breeding adults. Litters are usually smaller
in the southern sections of their range since there is less snow. Newborns are fully furred, open-eyed, and mobile. They leave the natal form within a short time after birth, often within 24 hours. After leaving the birthplace, siblings stay near each other during the day, gathering once each evening to nurse. Weaning occurs at 25 to 28 days except for the last litter of the season, which may nurse for two months or longer.

Female snowshoe hares can become pregnant anytime after the 35th day of gestation. The second litter can therefore be conceived before the first litter is born (snowshoe hares have twin uteri). Pregnancy rates ranged from 78 to 100% for females during the period of first litter production, 82 to 100% for second litters, and for the periods of third and fourth litters pregnancy rates vary with population cycle. In Newfoundland, the average number of litters per female per year ranged from 2.9 to 3.5, and in Alberta the range was from 2.7 to 3.3. The number of litters per year varies with phase of population cycle (see below). In Alberta the average number of litters per year was almost 3 just after a population peak and 4 just after the population low. Females normally first breed as 1-year-olds. Juvenile breeding is rare and has only been observed in females from the first litter of the year and only in years immediately following a low point in the population cycle.

In Yukon, 30-day survival of radio-tagged leverets was 46%, 15%, and 43% for the first, second, and third litters of the year, respectively. There were no differences in mortality in plots with food added. The main proximate cause of mortality was predation by small mammals, including red squirrels (Tamiasciurus hudsonicus) and Arctic ground squirrels (Spermophilus parryii). Littermates tended to live or die together more often than by chance. Individual survival was negatively related to litter size and positively related to body size at birth. Litter size is negatively correlated with body size at birth.

Population cycles 

Northern populations of snowshoe hares undergo cycles that range from seven to 17 years between population peaks. The average time between peaks is approximately 10 years. The period of abundance usually lasts for two to five years, followed by a population decline to lower numbers or local scarcity. Areas of great abundance tend to be scattered. Populations do not peak simultaneously in all areas, although a great deal of synchronicity occurs in northern latitudes. From 1931 to 1948, the cycle was synchronized within one or two years over most of Canada and Alaska, despite differences in predators and food supplies. In central Alberta, low snowshoe hare density occurred in 1965, with 42 to 74 snowshoe hares per 100 acres (40 ha). The population peak occurred in November 1970 with 2,830 to 5,660 snowshoe hares per 100 acres (40 ha). In the southern parts of its range, snowshoe hare populations do not fluctuate radically.

Exclosure experiments in Alberta indicated browsing by snowshoe hares during population peaks has the greatest impact on palatable species, thus further reducing the amount of available foods. In this study, insufficient nutritious young browse was available to sustain the number of snowshoe hares present in the peak years (1971 and 1972) in winter.

The hare's fluctuating numbers are modelled by the Lotka–Volterra equations.

Preferred habitat 

Major variables in habitat quality include average visual obstruction and browse biomass. Snowshoe hares prefer young forests with abundant understories. The presence of cover is the primary determinant of habitat quality, and is more significant than food availability or species composition. Species composition does, however, influence population density; dense softwood understories support greater snowshoe hare density than hardwoods because of cover quality. In Maine, female snowshoe hares were observed to be more common on sites with less cover but more nutritious forage; males tended to be found on sites with heavier cover.

Winter browse availability depends on height of understory brush and winter snow depth;  saplings with narrow stem diameters are required for winter browse in heavy snow.

In northern regions, snowshoe hares occupy conifer and mixed forests in all stages of succession, but early successional forests foster peak abundance. Deciduous forests are usually occupied only in early stages of succession. In New England, snowshoe hares preferred second-growth deciduous, coniferous, and mixed woods with dense brushy understories; they appear to prefer shrubby old-field areas, early- to mid-successional burns, shrub-swamps, bogs, and upper montane krumholz vegetation. In Maine, snowshoe hares were more active in clearcut areas than in partially cut or uncut areas. Sapling densities were highest on 12- to 15-year-old plots; these plots were used more than younger stands. In northern Utah, they occupied all the later stages of succession on quaking aspen and spruce-fir, but were not observed in meadows. In Alberta, snowshoe hares use upland shrub-sapling stages of regenerating aspens (either postfire or postharvest). In British Columbia overstocked juvenile lodgepole pine (Pinus contorta) stands formed optimal snowshoe hare habitat.

In western Washington, most unburned, burned, or scarified clearcuts will normally be fully occupied by snowshoe hares within four to five years, as vegetation becomes dense. In older stands (more than 25 years), stem density begins to decline and cover for snowshoe hares decreases. However, in north-central Washington, they may not
colonize clearcuts until six or seven years, and it may take 20 to 25 years for their density to reach maximum. Winter snowshoe hare pellet counts were highest in 20-year-old lodgepole pine stands, lower in older lodgepole stands, and lowest in spruce-dominated stands. In western Oregon, snowshoe hares were abundant only in early successional stages, including stable brushfields. In west-central Oregon, an old-growth Douglas-fir forest was clearcut and monitored through 10 years of succession. A few snowshoe hares were noted in adjacent virgin forest plots; they represented widely scattered, sparse populations. One snowshoe hare was observed on the disturbed plot 2.5 years after it had been clearcut and burned; at this stage, ground cover was similar to that of the uncut forest. By 9 years after disturbance, snowshoe hare density had increased markedly.

In western Washington, snowshoe hares routinely used steep slopes where cover was adequate; most studies, however, suggest they tend to prefer gentle slopes. Moonlight increases snowshoe hare vulnerability to predation, particularly in winter. They tend to avoid open areas during bright phases of the moon and during bright periods of a single night. Their activity usually shifts from coniferous understories in winter to hardwood understories in summer.

Vegetative structure plays an important role in the size of snowshoe hare home ranges. Snowshoe hares wander up to 5 miles (8 km) when food is scarce. In Montana home ranges are smaller in brushy woods than in open woods. In Colorado and Utah, the average home range of both sexes was 20 acres (8.1 ha). On the Island of Montreal in Quebec, the average daily range for both sexes was 4 acres (1.6 ha) in old-field mixed woods. In Montana, the home range averaged 25 acres (10 ha) for males and 19 acres (7.6 ha) for females. In Oregon the average snowshoe hare home range was 14.6 acres (5.9 ha).

Cover requirements 

Snowshoe hares require dense, brushy, usually coniferous cover; thermal and escape cover are especially important for young hares. Low brush provides hiding, escape, and thermal cover. Heavy cover 10 feet (3 m) above ground provides protection from avian predators, and heavy cover 3.3 feet (1 m) tall provides cover from terrestrial predators. Overwinter survival increases with increased cover. A wide variety of habitat types are used if cover is available. Base visibility in good snowshoe hare habitat ranges from 2% at 16.5 feet (5 m) distance to 0% at 66 feet (20 m). Travel cover is slightly more open, ranging from 14.7% visibility at 16.5 feet (5 m) to 2.6% at 66 feet (20 m). Areas with horizontal vegetation density of 40 to 100% at 50 feet (15 m) are adequate snowshoe hare habitat in Utah.

Food habits 

Snowshoe hares eat a variety of plant materials. Forage type varies with season. Succulent green vegetation is consumed when available from spring to fall; after the first frost, buds, twigs, evergreen needles, and bark form the bulk of snowshoe hare diets until spring greenup. Snowshoe hares typically feed at night and follow well-worn forest paths to feed on various plants and trees.

Winter 

Snowshoe hares prefer branches, twigs, and small stems up to 0.25 inch (6.3 mm) diameter; larger stems are sometimes used in winter. In Yukon, they normally eat fast-growing birches and willows, and avoid spruce. At high densities, however, the apical shoots of small spruce are eaten. The snowshoe hare winter diet is dominated by bog birch (Betula glandulosa), which is preferred but not always available. Greyleaf willow (Salix glauca) is eaten most often when bog birch is not available. Buffaloberry (Shepherdia canadensis) is the fourth most common diet item. White spruce (Picea glauca) is eaten, but not preferred. In Alaska, spruce, willows, and alders comprise 75% of snowshoe hare diets; spruce needles make up nearly 40% of the diet. In northwestern Oregon, winter foods include needles and tender bark of Sitka spruce, Douglas-fir, and western hemlock (Tsuga heterophylla); leaves and green twigs of salal; buds, twigs, and bark of willows; and green herbs. In north-central Washington, willows and birches are not plentiful; snowshoe hares browse the tips of lodgepole pine seedlings. In Utah, winter foods include Douglas-fir, willows, snowberry (Symphoricarpos spp.), maples, and serviceberry (Amelanchier spp.). In Minnesota, aspens, willows, hazelnut (Corylus spp.), ferns (Pteridophyta spp.), birches, alders, sumacs (Rhus spp.), and strawberries (Fragaria spp.) are winter foods. Winter foods in New York include eastern white pine, red pine (Pinus resinosa), white spruce, paper birch, and aspens. In Ontario, sugar maple (Acer saccharum), striped maple (A. pensylvanicum), red maple, other deciduous species, northern white-cedar (T. occidentalis), balsam fir, beaked hazelnut (C. cornuta), and buffaloberry were heavily barked. In New Brunswick, snowshoe hares consumed northern white-cedar, spruces, American beech (Fagus grandifolia), balsam fir, mountain maple (A. spicatum), and many other species of browse. In Newfoundland, paper birch is preferred. Further details on regional food preferences are summarized in Snowshoe hare and allies:

Recent studies show that Snowshoe hares also eat meat including flesh from their own species.

Spring, summer and autumn 

In Alaska, snowshoe hares consume new leaves of blueberries (Vaccinium spp.), new shoots of field horsetails (Equisetum arvense), and fireweed (Epilobium angustifolium) in spring.
Grasses are not a major item due to low availability associated with sites that have adequate cover. In summer, leaves of willows, black spruce, birches, and bog Labrador tea (Ledum groenlandicum) are also consumed. Black spruce is the most heavily used and the most common species in the area. Pen trials suggest black spruce is not actually preferred. Roses (Rosa spp.) were preferred, but a minor dietary item, as they were not common in the study area. In northwest Oregon, summer foods include grasses, clovers (Trifolium spp.), other forbs, and some woody plants, including Sitka spruce, Douglas-fir, and young leaves and twigs of salal. In Minnesota, aspens, willows, grasses, birches, alders, sumacs, and strawberries are consumed when green. In Ontario, summer diets consist of clovers, grasses, and forbs.

Predators 

The snowshoe hare is a major prey item for a number of predators. Its foremost predator is the Canada lynx (Lynx canadensis), but other predators include bobcats (L. rufus), fishers (Pekania pennanti), American martens (Martes americana), Pacific martens, (M. caurina), long-tailed weasels (Neogale frenata), minks (N. vison), foxes (Vulpes and Urocyon spp.), coyote (Canis latrans), domestic dogs (C. familiaris), domestic cats (Felis catus), wolves (Canis lupus), cougars (Puma concolor), great horned owls (Bubo virginianus), barred owls (Strix varia), spotted owls (S. occidentalis), other owls, red-tailed hawks (Buteo jamaicensis), northern goshawks (Accipiter gentilis), other hawks (Buteonidae), golden eagles (Aquila chryseatos), as well as corvids. Other predators include black bears (Ursus americanus). In Glacier National Park snowshoe hares are a prey item of Rocky Mountain wolves (Canis lupus irremotus).

Vulnerability to climate change 
The habitat for some snowshoe hares has changed dramatically, leaving some habitats without snow for longer periods than previously. Some hares have adapted and stay brown all winter. Others, however, continue to turn white in winter. These hares are at an increased risk of being hunted and killed because they are no longer camouflaged. Many people in the scientific community believe that snowshoe hare populations are at risk of crashing unless interbreeding speeds up the process of evolution to year-round brown. Other species who rely on the hare as part of their diet are also at risk.

References

External links 

Environmental Education for Kids!: Critter Corner
National Park Service
Snowshoe hare at Animal Diversity Web

Lepus
Arctic land animals
Mammals of the United States
Mammals of Canada
Fauna of Alaska
Fauna of the Sierra Nevada (United States)
Fauna of the Western United States
Fauna of the Great Lakes region (North America)
Mammals described in 1777
Taxa named by Johann Christian Polycarp Erxleben